{{DISPLAYTITLE:C20H27N}}
The molecular formula C20H27N (molar mass: 281.44 g/mol) may refer to:

 Alverine, a drug used for functional gastrointestinal disorders
 Terodiline